Yasodharapura ("Yaśōdharapura"), also known as Angkor, is a city that was the second capital of the Khmer Empire (after Amarendrapura), established by King Yasovarman I in the late 9th century and centred on the temple of Phnom Bakheng.

Yasodharapura was referred to in the inscriptions as Phnom Kandal (Central Mountain). Phnom Bakheng was constructed just before the foundation of Yasodharapura due to Yasovarman's belief that the mountain was among the holiest of places to worship the Hindu deities. Yashodharapura was linked to an earlier capital, Hariharalaya, by a causeway. The urban complex included the Yashodharatataka.

The succeeding capitals built in the area were called Yasodharapura. One of those is Angkor Thom, centred on the Bayon temple by King Jayavarman VII (1181-1218AD).

In 1352, King U Thong (also known as Ramathibodi I of the Ayutthaya Kingdom) laid siege to it. The Ayutthaya were successful the next year in capturing the city, placing one of their princes on the throne. In 1357 the Khmer regained it. Angkor Thom was raided and abandoned in the 15th century by King Borommarachathirat II of Ayutthaya.

References

Angkorian sites in Siem Reap Province
Former populated places in Cambodia